Cable (Nathan Christopher Charles Summers) is a fictional character appearing in American comic books published by Marvel Comics, commonly in association with X-Force and the X-Men.  child Nathan first appeared as a newborn infant in The Uncanny X-Men #201 (Jan. 1986) created by writer Chris Claremont and penciler Rick Leonardi, while the adult warrior Cable was created by writer Louise Simonson and artist/co-writer Rob Liefeld, and first appeared in The New Mutants #87 (March 1990). Initially, Cable's origin was undecided and he was assumed to be a separate character. It was later decided that he was actually an older version of the child Nathan, having later become a time traveler.

Nathan Summers is the son of the X-Men member Cyclops (Scott Summers) and his first wife Madelyne Pryor (Jean Grey's clone). This makes him the "half"-brother of Rachel Summers (a child of Scott and Jean from the "Days of Future Past" timeline) and Nate Grey (a child created from Scott and Jean's DNA from the timeline of the "Age of Apocalypse" storyline). The mutant terrorist Stryfe is a clone of Cable and one of his deadliest enemies. Cable is also the adoptive father of Hope Summers.

Born in the present-day, Nathan was infected with a deadly techno-organic virus while still an infant. He was sent into a possible future timeline where he could be treated and live his life. In this future world, Nathan grew into the warrior Cable and became an enemy of the villain Apocalypse. He later returned to the present-day era, initially arriving some years before his own birth. Since making his home in the modern era, he has worked alongside the X-Men (including Cyclops and Jean Grey) and reformed the New Mutants group into the original X-Force. He had frequent battles against the near-invincible assassin Deadpool, who later became an on-again, off-again ally for years. In the 2018 Extermination mini-series, Cable was killed and replaced by a younger, time-displaced version of himself who decided that the older one was ineffective in his crusade. This younger Cable (sometimes called Kid Cable) operated until 2021, when the original, older iteration was revived.

Cable was a recurring character in X-Men: The Animated Series (1992-1997), voiced by Lawrence Bayne, introducing him to a wider audience. The character made his live-action cinematic debut in Deadpool 2 (2018), portrayed by Josh Brolin.

Publication history

Creation

Nathan Christopher Charles Summers is the son of Scott Summers (aka Cyclops), and Madelyne Pryor (who was later revealed in the "Inferno" storyline to be a clone of Jean Grey). Writer Chris Claremont, who had written the series since issue #94 (Aug. 1975), revealed Madelyne to be pregnant in X-Men/Alpha Flight #1 (Dec. 1985). The next depiction of her pregnancy was in The Uncanny X-Men #200, when she goes into premature labor. In the following issue, #201 (Jan. 1986), Nathan first appears as a newborn infant.

The character's first appearance as the adult warrior Cable was at the end of The New Mutants #86 (Feb. 1990). He does not appear anywhere in the issue's story except for the "next issue" teaser. This was followed by a full appearance in The New Mutants #87 (March 1990). At first, Cable was not intended to be the adult version of Nathan Summers, but was created as a result of unrelated editorial concerns. Editor Bob Harras wanted to "shake things up" for the book, and felt a new leader was needed, a sharp contrast from the group's founder and first mentor, Professor X. The book's writer, Louise Simonson, thought a military leader would be a good idea, and Harras tasked the book's artist, Rob Liefeld, to conceptualize the character. Harras may also have suggested the character's bionic eye. Both Simonson and Liefeld each separately conceived of the leader being a mysterious time traveler from the future. Liefeld chose the name Cable for the character. Liefeld explains the creation of the character:

Harras and writer/artists Jim Lee and Whilce Portacio, who were writing the X-Men spinoff X-Factor that starred Cyclops and the other four original X-Men, decided that Nathan would be sent into the future and grow up to become Cable. Liefeld, who conceived that Cable and his archenemy Stryfe were one and the same, disliked this idea. (Eventually Stryfe was revealed to be a clone of Cable.) In the 1991 X-Factor storyline, Nathan is infected by the villain Apocalypse with a techno-organic virus. Because he can only be saved by the technology of the far-future, Scott reluctantly allows Sister Askani, a member of a clan of warriors dedicated to opposing Apocalypse, to take Nathan into the future so that he can be cured, a one-way trip from which she tells him she and Nathan will be unable to return.

New Mutants and X-Force
In his first adult appearance, Cable is seen in conflict with Stryfe's Mutant Liberation Front, the United States government, and Freedom Force. The New Mutants intervene and he asks for their help against the Mutant Liberation Front. Cable sees them as potential soldiers in his war against Stryfe, and becomes their new teacher and leader. He comes into conflict with Wolverine, who is revealed to harbor a feud with Cable. Despite this, the two warriors and the New Mutants team up against the MLF. Cable also leads the New Mutants against Cameron Hodge and the Genoshans in the 1990 "X-Tinction Agenda" storyline.

With the aid of Domino, Cable reorganizes the New Mutants into X-Force. The New Mutants ended with issue #100, with Cable and other characters then appearing the following month in X-Force #1. The X-Force series provided further detail for the character's back story revealing that he was from the future and that he had traveled to the past with the aim of stopping Stryfe's plans as well as preventing Apocalypse's rise to power. Cable traveled between the 1990s and his future with his ship Graymalkin, which contained a sentient computer program called Professor, the future version of the program built into X-Factor's Ship.

In 1992, the character starred in a two issue miniseries, Cable: Blood and Metal, written by Fabian Nicieza, pencilled by John Romita, Jr., and inked by Dan Green, published in October and November of that year. The series explored Cable and the villain Stryfe's ongoing battle with one another, and its effect on Cable's supporting cast.

Cable vol. 1, Soldier X and Major X

Shortly after Blood and Metal, Cable was given his own ongoing series titled Cable. Issue #6 (Dec. 1993) confirmed the character to be Nathan Christopher Summers, the son of Cyclops (Scott Summers) and Madelyne Pryor (Jean Grey's clone) who had been taken to the future in X-Factor #68 (July 1991), introduced by writer Chris Claremont, and appeared in Uncanny X-Men #201 (Jan. 1986). The series ran for 107 issues from May 1993 until September 2002 before being relaunched as Soldier X, which lasted 12 more issues until Aug. 2003.

The 1994 miniseries The Adventures of Cyclops and Phoenix provided further information on the character's back story. In the future, Mother Askani, a time-displaced Rachel Summers, pulled the minds of Scott and Jean into the future where, as "Slym" and "Redd", they raised Cable for twelve years. During their time together, the "family" prevented Apocalypse from transferring his essence into a new body, ending his reign of terror. It is furthermore established that Mister Sinister created Cyclops' son Nathan (who became the time-traveling soldier Cable) to destroy Apocalypse.

The 2019 miniseries Major X further revealed that at some point in a possible future, where mutants live together in a Utopian society called the X-Istence, Cable has fathered a son named Alexander Nathaniel Summers. Wearing a red-and-black costume that completely covers him from head-to-toe, Alexander under the Major X alias, traveled to the past in search of Cable with the hope he can help save his reality from fading away.

Cable & Deadpool, Cable vol. 2

After his solo series ended, Cable was paired with the mercenary Deadpool in a new ongoing series titled Cable & Deadpool. The series largely dealt with Cable's efforts to change the world for the better, including turning his old spaceship Greymalkin into the floating utopian island of Providence. The first story arc of the series features a Cable who has learned to suppress his techno-organic virus to a nearly effortless degree, allowing him to access the better part of his vast psionic powers. He gains a power level similar to his Nate Grey counterpart from The Age of Apocalypse reality and tries to use them to force the people of the world to live in peace. Using his powers at this magnitude also means that he will die due to the vast power being too much for his body to continuously maintain. 

Cable tries to carry out his plans quickly, defeating the X-Men, Six Pack and S.H.I.E.L.D. with little effort. They turn the tide of the battle on Cable by enlisting the aid of the Silver Surfer. Cable and the Silver Surfer battle, destroying buildings and other structures that are immediately rebuilt by Cable's vast telekinesis. Cable tries to explain his good intentions to the Surfer with no avail. Cable destroys the Surfer's board and briefly holds his own against the Surfer. He is ultimately defeated when the Surfer destroys Cable's arm, and Providence, held up by Cable's powers, falls into the sea. Deadpool, under Cable's orders, subsequently uses a piece of technology that lobotomizes the part of Cable's brain that controls his powerful telepathy and telekinesis, rendering him comatose. The Fixer brings Cable to life with the help of a Technarchy embryo, though his powers remain weakened.

Around the same time period, Cable becomes a member of a team of X-Men that consists of Rogue, Iceman, Cannonball, Sabretooth, Mystique, Lady Mastermind, and Omega Sentinel.

In preparation for Messiah Complex, Cable seemingly dies in issue #42 when he detonates Providence to prevent Gambit and Sunfire from stealing his database, causing the remainder of the series to be focused entirely on Deadpool. 

It is revealed that Cable survived, and has the mutant baby girl that the X-Men, Marauders, and Purifiers have been seeking during the Messiah Complex storyline.

Cable & Deadpool was canceled after issue #50, in which a resurrected and offscreen Cable delivers a psimitar tool to Deadpool to humanely remove the symbiote from dinosaurs that came from the Savage Land.

In 2008, Marvel Comics released Cable vol. 2, a new ongoing series by Duane Swierczynski and artist Ariel Olivetti. This new series directly follows the events of "Messiah Complex". The series features Cable, and the messianic child's time traveling adventures. The dangers of the future and pursuit by Bishop are balanced with the humor of "Cable the soldier" becoming "Cable the Nanny."

It is revealed that Cable and the mutant messiah have taken refuge in the future in the secluded safe haven of New Liberty. There, Cable marries a resident, Hope, who later dies defending the child. Cable decides to name her Hope, in honor of her deceased foster mother.

In 2009, Cable vol. 2 had a seven-issue crossover with X-Force, X-Force/Cable: Messiah War, which is the second story in a three-part storyline that began in X-Men: Messiah Complex.

After the events of the Messiah War, Hope and Cable are separated in time, appearing in the same spot but in different years. When Cable touches down from the spot, he appears two years after Hope, and is steadily losing control of his body due to the techno-organic virus within him. It alters his appearance so much that Hope does not register Cable's face. Eventually, Bishop, using his codename as a way to portray himself as a holy figure, gains on them, and Cable and Hope jettison themselves into space in the last ship the planet had. Bishop, armed with a thermonuclear device in the stump of his arm, states that he knows how to make his own ship and it'll only be a matter of time.

Cable was canceled in April 2010 with issue #25 (the final issue being called Deadpool and Cable #25).

In the 2010 storyline "Second Coming", Cable succumbs to the techno-organic virus in his bloodstream while holding open a time-portal that allowed other members of X-Force to escape from the future. The death was shown in X-Force #28 written by Craig Kyle and Chris Yost, who noted that, "For us, Cable was always a character whose death was something the character himself would put forward—if that's what it took to complete his mission, he wouldn't think twice about it."

Avengers: X-Sanction
On July 27, 2011, Marvel announced at the San Diego Comic Con the return of Cable. The new project, originally titled as "Cable Reborn", was re-titled as Avengers: X-Sanction, written by Jeph Loeb and drawn by Ed McGuinness. The miniseries served as a lead-in to the Avengers vs. X-Men storyline beginning in April 2012.

Having been teleported to the future during his last act, Cable learned from his old mentor, Blaquesmith, that Hope will apparently die in some future accident caused by the Avengers, prompting him to go back in time and try to use his last 24 hours of life before the techno-organic virus completely consumes his body to stop the Avengers before they can kill Hope.

Although he manages to defeat Captain America, Falcon, and Iron Man, he is caught off-guard when he is attacked by the Red Hulk, initially assuming that the Red Hulk is "Talbot", a foe from the future, before the Red Hulk informs him with grim satisfaction that he is actually someone who Cable has never fought before. With the aid of Blaquesmith – flashbacks revealing that they discovered various anti-mutant technologies in the Avengers Mansion – Cable manages to fight off the Red Hulk, partially infecting him with the techno-organic virus, only to be interrupted by Hope and Cyclops, who both denounce his actions as unnecessary, culminating in Wolverine and Spider-Man attacking him as they vow to take back the Avengers. During the fight with Wolverine, Spider-Man is taken out by Cyclops, and Blaquesmith convinces Hope to counter Cable's moves by freeing the Avengers, ripping out the bomb that Cable threatened would blow them up while Red Hulk burned the techno-organic virus out of his system.

The Avengers then proceeded to fight Cable until he was nearly dead from both the fight and the virus, and Cyclops asked to take his son home, with Captain America insisting the Avengers keep the weapons and ship. Back at Utopia, Blaquesmith helps Hope to realize that she can still save Cable, and she begins to absorb the techno-organic virus before fully manifesting the Phoenix Force raptor for the first time around herself. When it vanishes, Cable is cured not only of the advanced incursion of the virus, but apparently fully, as his left hand is shown to be fully organic along with his left eye, but he remains in a catatonic state. Afterwards, Cable and Cyclops speak telepathically, with Cable informing his father that Hope is indeed the Phoenix and is destined to save Earth from an unknown disaster. He goes on to say that a war will come with the Avengers and that he needs Cyclops to protect Hope. Cable promises to be there when he's needed in the future.

Cable and X-Force
Cable's next appearance was in a new series, Cable and X-Force by writer Dennis Hopeless and artist Salvador Larroca.  The series debuted in December 2012 and features Cable and a new fugitive team, unofficially referred to by the Marvel Universe media as the new "X-Force". This version of X-Force initially consists of Cable, Colossus, Doctor Nemesis, Domino, and Forge. This series focuses on eliminating disasters based on mysterious visions that Cable is receiving, resorting to occasionally more brutal methods than the prime X-teams would use. After the events of "Avengers X-Sanction" Cable is forced to wear an eye patch and an advanced harness for his non-functioning left arm that was created by Forge. Although Hope healed his arm, it is useless because it is not his original arm as it has been destroyed a few times, notably in his battles with Silver Surfer and Bastion.

X-Force
Continuing from Cable and X-Force Cable puts together a new X-Force team with Psylocke, Dr. Nemesis, Fantomex, Marrow and new recruit MeMe in order to track down and deal with mutant threats using lethal force. The story is written by X-Men: Legacy writer Simon Spurrier. Cable is infected with an extra-dimensional Super Soldier Serum that provides superpowers at the cost of killing them in around a year, however Cable is injected with an early version designed to kill him in a day. Cable's daughter Hope accidentally copies this virus, since it is based on superpowers, and has to be placed into a coma in order to save her life. Cable cannot defeat the virus either, so he creates a new clone each day to replace himself but each clone still has only one day to live. Cable and X-Force eventually track down the man Volga who created the biotech virus and defeat him. However, Fantomex goes insane from needing to "be the best" and betrays the team using new god-like powers derived from a digitized form of the Volga Effect he had copied during a tryst with Meme. Nemesis and Forget-Me-Not unleashes hundreds of Cable clones to fight him, with Hope eventually stopping Fantomex and saving cable after the last clone is killed wherein her father stepped up to bat while about to catch fire from Volga's poison. Hope then takes over as leader of X-Force and "fires" Cable for his morally questionable methods.

Cable and Deadpool: Split Second
After travelling through time and fixing several mistakes that a future Deadpool caused, Cable and present-Deadpool eventually fix the timeline. The effects on the timeline causes Cable to revert to his original "status quo", with his robotic arm and his original telekinesis and telepathic power set.

Uncanny Avengers
Cable is seen in the year 2087 dealing with some unidentified issue related to Stryfe, in the aftermath of an Inhuman attack that covers the city of Boston in sentient plant life led by the Shredded Man. He and his A.I. Belle eventually joins the rest of the Uncanny Avengers helping Synapse in the present and helps deal with the Inhuman causing the problems, before deciding to join the team when he learns the team's true mission is dealing with the Red Skull with Professor Xavier's brain and powers. After Captain America disbands the Uncanny Avengers in the aftermath of the "Civil War II" storyline and Cable and Rogue team up with villains Sebastian Shaw and Toad to find a cure for the Terrigen Mists, Rogue continues the team in their mission to stop the Red Skull.

Cable vol. 3 
After the events of "Secret Wars" storyline, Cable stars in his third ongoing monthly series, as part of Marvel's 2017 "X-Men: ResurrXion" relaunch of its X-Men and Inhumans-related books. In this series, Cable is depicted as a member of an organization that protects the Marvel universe timeline from damage caused by time travel. The first arc of this series "Conquest", sees Cable tracking down a time-traveling villain. The second arc, "The Newer Mutants", has Cable assemble a team trying to determine who is murdering Externals. The third arc, "Past Fears", spans five eras of Cable's history and sees him battling a techno-organic villain known as Metus.

Extermination
When the young Iceman is attacked by an unknown assailant, Cable arrives to save him. The assailant tells Cable that he failed his duty to protect time and kills Cable. The assailant and Cable's killer is later revealed to be a younger version of him (dubbed Kid Cable), who has arrived in the present to capture the five time-displaced X-Men since their presence in the current time period will bring forth a catastrophic future.

Nathan Summers (time-displaced version)
Kid Cable kidnaps Mimic then arrives at the X-Mansion and incapacitates young Angel and Beast but is only able to leave with the former. During Ahab's attack on the X-Mansion, Kid Cable returns and is able to capture young Beast. When he is confronted by the young Jean Grey and former members of X-Force (Domino, Warpath, and Boom-Boom), he clarifies that he is indeed the younger version of the Cable they knew (and that he murdered), and he then reveals that the reason he's been kidnapping the time-displaced X-Men is that he intends to return them all to the past (something that his older self never did, which is why he killed him). His reasoning for this is that Ahab will kill one of the young X-Men in the present, noting that although Ahab kills young Iceman, it does not actually matter which one dies, as long as it is one of the five); this greatly changes huge parts of their future: battles they won are now lost; humans turn against Mutants much sooner; and an earlier and stronger version of the Sentinel Program and Reaver Virus arise. The effect of these changes is that it brings an earlier and deadlier end to the X-Men. As such, Kid Cable saw fit to kidnap them all so he can personally return them back to their past (even kidnapping Mimic so he would remove his wings and attach them to young Angel, since the latter did not have cosmic fire wings in the past).

After the young X-Men have returned to the past—with Jean suppressing their memories of the future until they 'catch up' with the present—it is revealed that Kid Cable is the younger version of Cable, until he caused their timelines to diverge, when he brought Cyclops back to life, through a complex plan involving capturing a fragment of the Phoenix Force to restore him.<ref>The Uncanny X-Men Annual vol. 5 #1</ref> Kid Cable also apparently tipped Bishop, a time-traveling X-Man and occasional detective, about an unspecified, imminent event that would have catastrophic consequences on the X-Men's timeline; this led him to Sugar Man's lab, where he had a quick confrontation with the frightened villain before getting knocked unconscious. By the time Bishop woke up, Sugar Man was dead and his body was split in two. The event was soon revealed to be the return of Nate Grey. Nate's mind was twisted when he found and used the Life Seed on himself; this not only made him recover his powers but also increased them to the point of overriding the black X-shaped tattoo that was protecting him. Kid Cable keeps Cyclops in his base for a time, admitting that he just tweaked history in this manner because he did not want his father dead; however, when he was faced with the separate threats of the X-Men battling Nate Grey and a human scientist (whose life was saved by Cyclops in the past) now threatened by his insane former professor, Kid Cable tells Cyclops that he can save one or the other, with Cyclops' choice of the scientist sparing him the apparent destruction of the other X-Men and giving Scott the incentive to reexamine his actions prior to his death.

Dawn of X
By remaining in the present, Kid Cable has since replaced his older version, the original Cable has not been restored to life by the resurrection capabilities of the Five due to the laws against restoring multiple versions of one person. Kid Cable then joined the mutant nation of Krakoa when it was founded and attended a family barbecue, where he traded guns with Raza of the Starjammers.

When Kwannon formed a team to investigate the new threat of Apoth and the Overclock drug, she enlisted the aid of X-23 and Cable. He would later investigate the emergence of a mysterious island, that was approaching Krakoa, alongside Cyclops and Prestige. Despite some hostility from the local lifeforms, in part due to Cable handing one a grenade as a gift, which it then activated, the situation was resolved.

While investigating an Apoth location in Brazil, Cable was captured by Apoth's servants, who saw Cable as the symbolic unity between man, machine, and mutant.

Later he became one of the Swordbearers of Krakoa during X of Swords, and even found romance with Esme of the Stepford Cuckoos, much to the chagrin of Emma Frost. He has also been busy trying to deal with one lingering threat from the days of his predecessor: Stryfe. His villainous clone has been making moves around the world and has successfully kidnapped a number of mutant infants. However, because he does not have the knowledge and experience of his older self, Kid Cable has not been able to do much but pick up the pieces after Stryfe's actions.

With few other ways to contend with Stryfe, Cable has made peace with the idea of returning to the time-stream and becoming the aged Cable himself as to potentially give them an edge over Stryfe. However Hope Summers, the adopted daughter of the older Cable, breaks the cardinal rule of resurrection by convincing the rest of the Five to help restore the original Cable. With Xavier's help and blessing, they are able to pull a copy of Cable's mind from shortly before his death. They even make sure to restore the TO-Virus that previously ravaged Cable's body, with Hope noting that Cable had it under control and would want to continue studying the infection. Working together, the Five and Xavier quickly create a new body for the old Cable and restore him to life.

Powers and abilities
Cable was born with telepathic and telekinetic abilities. However, the extent to which he has been able to utilize these powers has varied dramatically throughout his appearances. Originally, both were limited by his need to restrain his techno-organic infection, and his powers were negligible compared to his more traditional fighting skills. However, following the subsidence of the infection, they gradually increased to the point where they were similar in magnitude to those of Nate Grey, to whom he is genetically identical. At their height, he demonstrated the ability to simultaneously levitate the floating city of Providence and combat the Silver Surfer.

Following that story, his powers were burnt out and he replaced both with technological substitutes. He later lost and regained his abilities again when he was de-aged during House of M while mending Deadpool's maligned physiology as he progressed to his proper age. Cable himself stating that both his telepathy and telekinesis have faded to nothing.

Cable has fought Wolverine to a stalemate, and defeated Captain America in hand-to-hand combat and defeated Falcon, Red Hulk and Iron Man using both brute force and wit, all while Cable was in severe pain and hours away from dying of his techno-organic infection.

When Professor Xavier's son Legion travels back in time to kill Magneto in the "Legion Quest" storyline, Beast notes that Cable possesses "latent time-travel abilities". With the assistance of Shi'ar technology, Professor Xavier "jump-starts" this ability while Jean Grey telekinetically holds Cable's body together, allowing Cable to send his consciousness into the past.

His techno-organic body parts possess enhanced strength and durability, and his techno-organic left eye gives him enhanced eyesight, allowing him to see farther than a normal human and in the infrared spectrum. He is also able to interface his techno-organic body parts with other types of machinery, an ability that allows him to hack into computers, open electronic locks, and travel through time.

In the "Messiah War" storyline, during the fight with his clone, Stryfe, Cable demonstrates the ability to hide others from Stryfe's mental view, implying that at least he retains some of his telepathic powers. He also still possesses some of his telekinesis, but he is using it solely to keep the techno-organic virus in his body at bay.Cable vol. 2 #15 (Aug. 2009). Marvel Comics. As well as holding onto just enough telepathic power in order to simulate technopathy and facilitate technopathy through the use of future Stark Industries technology.

As of the end of the "Avengers: X-Sanction" storyline, Hope Summer has apparently cured Cable of the techno-organic virus using the Phoenix Force, and appears to at least have his telepathy. As a result, his cybernetic eye and arm have been restored to flesh and blood, although almost nonfunctional and atrophied, forcing Cable to wear an eyepatch (hiding a psimitar like implant) and use an enhanced brace, made by Forge and laden with special weaponry. Due to a future Hope's tampering with his mind, he also gained the ability to see multiple possible future events before they unfolded.

After being afflicted by a derivative of the super soldier formula begotten from an alternate reality. Cable was left incapacitated as the faulty chemical weapons test would cause his physiology to self-destruct if left unchecked. To compensate for his genetic instability, he had Dr. Nemesis place his body in suspended animation until they could find a cure for his condition. In the meantime, Cable would operate his X-Force team through short-lived clones whom had a fraction of his precognition and a shortened lifespan due to being carbon copies with the faulty Volga Effect serum coursing in their systems. Making his clones useful for kamikaze attacks as they only last about a day's time before violently detonating on their own or when they whistle an audio failsafe to trigger it.

In Deadpool & Cable: Split Second, Cable once again loses most of his powers, but retains his precognition. However, he regains them along with his cybernetics as a result of Deadpool repairing Cable's personal timeline.

Cable not only regained his psionic abilities, he had even regained the underlying potential he had always possessed since infancy. Having engaged in a psionic battle with a clone of the Red Skull, who had stolen the brain of the deceased Charles Xavier, the clone revealed that Mr. Summers was in fact an omega level mutant. Nathan often makes use of a spear-like morph weapon called the Psi-Mitar, which was originally a long staff with a spear point on one end and a scythe blade on the other, used primarily by the Askani. It functions as a focus and amplifier for telepathic or telekinetic power, which it can combine then project as powered psychic force blasts.

Apart from his superhuman abilities, Cable has been said to have a brilliant mind for military tactics.

Reception
 In 2014, Entertainment Weekly ranked Cable 6th in their "Let's rank every X-Man ever" list.
 In 2018, CBR.com ranked Cable 11th in their "8 X-Men Kids Cooler Than Their Parents (And 7 Who Are Way Worse)" list.
 In 2018, CBR.com ranked Cable 1st in their "X-Force: 20 Powerful Members" list.

Other versions
In addition to his mainstream Marvel Universe incarnation, Cable has been depicted in other fictional universes.

Cable and Deadpool
In the Cable and Deadpool series storyline "Enema of State", Deadpool and the mutants Cannonball and Siryn discover several alternate versions of Cable as they traverse several alternate universes, searching for the Cable who was native to their own reality. They first encounter an evil incarnation of Cable who has become one of the four Horsemen of Apocalypse, taking the name War. Other versions include a guru-type known as "Brother Nathan" living on an Earth where all violence has been abolished, a Phalanx-possessed Cable consumed by the techno-organic virus within his body, and an infant version cared for by Mister Sinister on a quiet Nebraska farm in the "House of M" reality. Deadpool eventually realizes the infant is indeed his version of Cable, de-aged. Returning the child to their home universe, Deadpool cares for Nathan until an injection of Deadpool's DNA allows him to rapidly grow back into adulthood.

Earth X
In the reality of the Earth X series and its sequel comics, the Techno-organic virus has overtaken Cable's body, transforming him into a blob of organic metal.

Deadpool Pulp
In the Deadpool Pulp timeline, Cable is a human military officer called General Cable native to the early 20th century. Along with his colleagues General Stryfe and J. Edgar Hoover, he hires former CIA man Wade Wilson to get back a stolen nuclear briefcase.

Wolverine: Rahne of Terra
In the fantasy world depicted in the graphic novel Wolverine: Rahne of Terra, Cable's counterpart is a wizard called the Mage, who carries the Warlock Staff and a crossbow.

Ultimate Marvel
In Ultimate X-Men, Cable is actually an older Wolverine who lives in a possible future. He time travels to his past in order to prepare Professor Xavier for a coming battle with Apocalypse. After Apocalypse's death, Cable fades out of existence, having now changed the past.

What If..?
A two-part storyline in the series What If... asks, "What If Cable Destroyed the X-Men?" In this story, Cable clashes with Professor X and the X-Men over their beliefs and differences in methods. Ultimately, Cable leads a faction of mutants loyal to him and assassinates the Professor, Cyclops, and Jean Grey before embarking on a violent crusade. Cable is ultimately killed by Wolverine, but his actions have already led to the further mistrust and oppression of mutants. Magneto attempts to take control of the United States in the chaos, but is killed by a new model of plastic Sentinels, who decide that enslaving humanity is the best way to root out mutants. Wolverine assembles a new team of X-Men to fight the Sentinel rule.

X-Men ForeverX-Men Forever volume 2 and the sequel series X-Men Forever 2 take place in an alternate universe written by Chris Claremont that picks up after the events of X-Men #3 (1991). The series depicts stories and ideas Claremont would have done if he hadn't left the series in 1991. In this timeline, Nathan was still saved during the "Inferno" event, but was aged somehow from a toddler into an older child. Wishing to distance him from the dangers the X-Men face, Cyclops sends Nathan to live with his great-grandmother and grandfather in Alaska. An attack by mysterious agents causes Nathan to be moved to the protective custody of the Starjammers. He is shown to possess telepathic powers. Cable appears in one panel of the series but no connection between Cable and Nathan is made, possibly because Claremont intended to follow the original idea that they were separate characters.

In other media
Television
Cable appears in X-Men: The Animated Series, voiced by Lawrence Bayne. This version's metal arm is a bionic construct rather than the result of a techno-organic virus, is never shown to be telepathic, and is also depicted as coming from the year 3999, in which he leads an army in a desperate war against Apocalypse's forces.

Film
Josh Brolin was cast in a four-picture deal with 20th Century Fox to play Nathan Summers / Cable in their X-Men film series, with Deadpool 2 as his first appearance. In May 2017, producer Hutch Parker discussed the future of the franchise, stating that the introduction of Cable with his time-traveling abilities makes an interconnection between the then-upcoming New Mutants, Deadpool 2, and Dark Phoenix, as well as previous films a possibility.

In his first appearance, Cable is depicted as a mysterious time-traveling soldier from a devastated future with a cybernetic left arm and eye who travels back in time to assassinate the young mutant Russell Collins before he kills Cable's wife and daughter. Deadpool forms X-Force to stop him, but both sides hit an impasse when Russell teams up with the Juggernaut. Cable decides to work with X-Force to defeat the two threats, but allows Deadpool the chance to redeem Russell before the youth becomes a murderer. Deadpool sacrifices himself when Cable tries to shoot Russell, causing the latter to reject a future as a killer, which saves Cable's family. In return, Cable sacrifices his chance to reunite with his family to save Deadpool and stay in the present.

Video games
 Cable appears as a playable character in Marvel vs. Capcom 2: New Age of Heroes, voiced again by Lawrence Bayne.
 Cable appears as an exclusive hidden character in the PSP version of X-Men Legends II: Rise of Apocalypse.
 Cable appears as a hidden character in X-Men: Gamesmaster's Legacy.
 Cable appears in X-Men: Reign of Apocalypse.
 Cable appears as a non-player character and boss in Marvel: Ultimate Alliance 2, voiced by Keith Ferguson. In the Pro-Registration campaign, the heroes fight and defeat Cable before seeing him arrested. However, he and Hercules are later broken out by Captain America. In the Anti-Registration campaign, Cable commands the player for a mission. Following the Prison 42 incident, Cable goes missing and is presumed dead. He was later added as a playable character in the Xbox 360 and PS3 versions of the game via downloadable content, and was part of the initial roster of heroes in the PS4, Xbox One, and PC versions.
 Cable makes a cameo appearance in Deadpool's ending in Ultimate Marvel vs. Capcom 3. Additionally, Deadpool received a "Cablepool" costume via downloadable content.
 Cable appears as a playable character in Marvel Super Hero Squad Online.
 Cable appears as an unlockable character in Marvel: Avengers Alliance.
 Cable appears as a supporting character in Deadpool,  voiced by Fred Tatasciore.
 Cable appears as a playable character in Marvel Heroes, voiced by James M. Connor.
 Cable appears as a playable character in Marvel: Future Fight.
 Cable appears as a playable character in Marvel Puzzle Quest.
 Cable appears as a paid DLC playable character in Marvel Ultimate Alliance 3: The Black Order, voiced again by James M. Connor.
 Cable appears as a purchasable outfit in Fortnite Battle Royale.

Influence
Artist Alex Ross drew upon his dislike of Liefeld's design of Cable when Ross designed the character Magog for the 1996 miniseries Kingdom Come''. Following writer Mark Waid's instructions that the character's appearance be based on aspects of superhero design trends of the time that they disliked, Ross said of Cable, "That's a character that Mark Waid invented that was really just put to me like come up with the most God awful, Rob Liefeld sort of design that you can. What I was stealing from was – really only two key designs of Rob's – the design of Cable. I hated it. I felt like it looked like they just threw up everything on the character – the scars, the thing going on with his eye, the arm, and what's with all the guns? But the thing is, when I put those elements together with the helmet of Shatterstar – I think that was his name – well, the ram horns and the gold, suddenly it held together as one of the designs that I felt happiest with in the entire series."

Collected editions

The stories have been collected in a number of trade paperbacks.

Mini-series

Cable and X-Force (2013 series)

Oversized hardcovers

References

External links
 Cable at Marvel.com
 
 Spotlight On...Cable at UncannyXmen.net
 Comics Buyer’s Guide Fan Awards

Avengers (comics) characters
Characters created by Chris Claremont
Characters created by Louise Simonson
Characters created by Rob Liefeld
Comics characters introduced in 1990
Cyborg superheroes
Deadpool characters
Fictional characters displaced in time
Fictional characters with precognition
Fictional gunfighters in comics
Fictional mercenaries in comics
Fictional schoolteachers
Fictional technopaths
Marvel Comics characters who can teleport
Marvel Comics characters who have mental powers
Marvel Comics characters with superhuman strength
Marvel Comics cyborgs
Marvel Comics film characters
Marvel Comics male superheroes
Marvel Comics martial artists
Marvel Comics mutants
Marvel Comics telekinetics
Marvel Comics telepaths
New Mutants
Time travelers
X-Men supporting characters